Knockalton Upper is a townland in the historical Barony of Ormond Upper, County Tipperary, Ireland.

Location
Knockalton Upper is located south of Knockalton Lower in north County Tipperary. It is south-west of Nenagh in the vicinity of junction 25 of the M7 motorway.

References

Townlands of County Tipperary